Baccaurea ramiflora, the Burmese grape, is a slow-growing evergreen tree in the family Phyllanthaceae, growing to 25 m, with a spreading crown and thin bark. It is native to Asia, from Nepal in the west, east to southern China and south to Peninsular Malaysia. It grows in evergreen forests on a wide range of soils. The fruit is harvested and used locally, eaten as a fruit, stewed or made into wine; it is also used medicinally to treat skin diseases. The bark, roots and wood are harvested for medicinal uses.

The fruit is oval, colored yellowish, pinkish to bright red or purple, 2.5–3.5 cm in diameter, glabrous, with 2–4 large purple-red seed, with white aril.

Bark, roots, and wood are dried and ground before boiling in water. Fruits can be kept fresh for 4–5 days, or boiled and mixed with salt after which it keeps well in closed jars.  Marginal importance of the fruit, locally used and sold.

References

ramiflora
Flora of China
Flora of Indo-China
Flora of the Indian subcontinent
Flora of Peninsular Malaysia